Gerald FitzGerald, 17th Knight of Glin (died 1689) was an Irish Jacobite soldier and politician.

FitzGerald was the son of John FitzGerald, 16th Knight of Glin and Honora O'Connor. 

Between 1661 and 1666, FitzGerald was the Member of Parliament for Limerick City in the Irish House of Commons. In 1680, he was appointed High Sheriff of County Limerick. FitzGerald was a supporter of James II following the Glorious Revolution, and in 1689 he represented Limerick County in the brief Patriot Parliament in Dublin. He also fought as an officer in James' Irish army and was killed in the Battle of Windmill Hill following the Siege of Derry in 1689.

He had married Joan O'Brien, daughter of Donough O'Brien, and was succeeded as knight by his son, Thomas FitzGerald.

References

Year of birth unknown
1689 deaths
17th-century Irish people
Gerald
High Sheriffs of County Limerick
Irish Jacobites
Irish MPs 1661–1666
Irish MPs 1689
Irish soldiers in the army of James II of England
Members of the Parliament of Ireland (pre-1801) for County Limerick constituencies